The Miracle Man is a 1919 American silent drama film starring Lon Chaney and based on a 1914 play by George M. Cohan, which in turn is based on the novel of the same title by Frank L. Packard. The film was released by Paramount Pictures, directed, produced, and written by George Loane Tucker, and also stars Thomas Meighan and Betty Compson. The film made overnight successes of the three stars, most notably putting Chaney on the map as a character actor.

Paramount remade the film in 1932 also titled The Miracle Man with Hobart Bosworth, Chester Morris, John Wray, and Sylvia Sidney. Today, the majority of the 1919 film is considered lost, with only two fragments, totaling about three minutes, surviving.

Plot
The film takes place in a small, New England town in 1919 (the Broadway play 1914), where a group of con men plan to use a faith healer to collect money.

In New York City's Chinatown, four crooks conspire to swindle a small New England town. The gang consists of Tom Burke (Thomas Meighan), the head of the group; Rose (Betty Compson), a con artist posing as a street walker; "The Dope" (J.M. Dumont), who pretends to pimp Rose; and The Frog (Lon Chaney), a contortionist.

The plan is clear: in a small town outside of Boston there is a Patriarch (Joseph Dowling) who has been healing people. The group heads to the town and plans to use the Patriarch in a faith healing scheme. When the townspeople gather to see the Patriarch heal the sick, the Frog is there, posing as a cripple. As he crawls to the path of the man, his limbs become straightened and soon he walks to the Patriarch, supposedly healed. Unexpectedly, a crippled boy, his faith in the Patriarch overpowering him, loses his crutches and runs to the Patriarch.

The story spreads across the country (mostly on account of Burke), and people flock in from all over to visit the Patriarch and be healed. When a millionaire, Richard King (W. Lawson Butt), brings his sister to be healed, he gives Burke $50,000 after the Patriarch cures her. During this visit, King meets Rose, and the two fall in love.

Meanwhile, all is not well with Burke. One by one, he sees his gang disbanding because, unbeknownst to him, the healing power of the Patriarch is at work. The Dope gives up his drug addiction, The Frog gives up his life of crime and takes care of a widow left all alone, and Rose laments King's departure.

Burke becomes jealous, but when King returns to propose marriage to Rose, she realizes that she loves Burke.  The Patriarch dies, and the two lovers begin anew.

Cast

Background and production
Initially intended as a vehicle for Meighan after he saw the Cohan play, Cohan sold the rights to the story to Paramount for $25,000. Packard sold the rights to his original novel for $17,500. George Loane Tucker had previously been hailed as one of the "first of the immortals" of film directors after his 1913 success, Traffic in Souls. Alfred A. Grasso, an assistant director on the film, would later go on to serve as Lon Chaney's business manager and personal friend.

Lon Chaney was chosen by director George Loane Tucker, and this was his eighth film as a free-lance artist after leaving Universal Studios in 1918.  His work in the William S. Hart picture, Riddle Gawne established him as a character actor of some notoriety, but it was The Miracle Man that would put both his acting and makeup skills (for which he was famous) to the test. Chaney auditioned for the part of The Frog in Tucker's office, grotesquely contorting his body. Tucker was reportedly "shaken" by the intensity of Chaney's performance.

This film version is more based on the novel than the stage play. However, neither the movie nor the stage play used the character names from the novel.

Reception
The Miracle Man was well received by both critics and audiences. Initially produced for $126,000, the film grossed $1,000,000 in theatrical rentals and became the second highest-grossing film of 1919. During the film's run at the Orchestra Hall in Chicago, (where it broke all house records), airplanes dropped free tickets and brass coins which read "The Miracle Man is here" printed on one side and "Have faith, keep this" on the other.

Because of the film's success, it launched its leads, Compson, Meighan and Chaney, into stardom. Meighan later went on to major leading roles while Chaney became one of the highest paid character actors in Hollywood until his death in 1930. Compson's name rose above the titles of most of the movies she made for the rest of the silent era. George Loane Tucker received critical success from the film and planned more, but only completed one more film before his death in 1921.

In 1920, Photoplay magazine held a "Letter Contest" polling their readers regarding their twelve favorite films.  The Miracle Man ranked at #1, beating out Broken Blossoms, The Birth of a Nation, and The Kid.

Contemporary Reviews
"Since BEN HUR nothing approaching this has been seen on stage or screen, and it has BEN HUR beaten seven ways for real sentiment. It is simpler, more true to life as we know it, and so more effective...Commercially, this is a picture that will coin money. Artistically, it marks hope's triumph over experience." ---Variety

"Pictorially, the drama is a succession of compositions that have true artistic form. The conception and handling of the scenes in which The Frog is the central figure...are daring and masterly. Only in the drawings of Dore for Victor Hugo's Hunchback of Notre Dame can such criminal monstrosities be found...Three of the performances in the picture are sufficiently meritorious to rank with any impersonation so far known to the screen. These performances are the Tom Burke of Thomas Meighan, the Rose of Betty Compson, and The Frog of Lon Chaney." ---Moving Picture World

"If ever a play made stars, this one will. Whose is the finest performance? Really, I don't know. I should say that honors are even, gauged only by the various opportunities...Lon Chaney is so good as the Frog that I cannot think of anyone who could have played that grotesque monster as effectively." ---Photoplay

"It has been shown that thru the magic of the motion picture the people can be dazzled by pagentry, thrilled by magnificent spectacle and the simulation of dramatic perils. But they become sated with these mechanical ingenuities and extravagances. It is when the secret places of the heart are opened to them that the response is greatest, as to this revelation of the silent power of faith and purity, in a story unfolding in the beauty and fragrance of a flower. / We would not envy the man or woman, however intellectual, who could see this simple drama unmoved, who would not confess deriving from it a new sense of kinship with humanity and a deeper understanding of the spiritual forces of existence. ---Motion Picture News

"Unusually good work is done by Thomas Meighan, Betty Compson and Lon Chaney in a picture which will please all movie enthusiasts and convert a few more." ---New York Times

"Lon Chaney as the deformed cripple, The Frog, does some of the best work of his career.....(Mr. Chaney offers a bit of character study that will entrench him firmly in the minds of those who witness it.  George Loane Tucker has given the screen a masterpiece." ----Exhibitors Trade Review

"The Miracle Man is the most exceptionally entertaining and trememdously appealing dramatic production I have ever seen....Lon Chaney, in an exceptional characterization, will be remembered forever by everyone who sees this film." ---Wid's Film Daily

Preservation

The majority of The Miracle Man is now lost.
However, two fragments of the film survive: the first is a segment of one of Paramount's Movie Milestone series, Movie Memories (1935), showcasing the studios' greatest achievements.  This clip shows both a segment from the conclave in Chinatown as well as the healing scene, which was praised by critics as one of the most powerful scenes yet put on film. A nitrate print of Movie Memories is reportedly at the UCLA Film and Television Archive but has not yet been preserved.

The second clip that survives is part of a short promotional film called The House That Shadows Built (1931) made for Paramount's 20th anniversary of its founding in 1912. This footage was used when a full print of the film still existed. All told, a total of only about 3 minutes of the film exists at this point.

Home media
The documentary Movie Milestones with the surviving fragments was released from Blackhawk Films in 8mm format in the 1970s. These fragments were featured in the 1995 documentary Lon Chaney: Behind the Mask, produced by Kino International and included on the 2012 DVD release version of The Penalty (1920).

References

External links 

 
 
 
The Miracle Man at Virtual History
surviving lantern slide
Lon Chaney and Ruby Lafayette
Betty Compson and W. Lawson Butt; #1,..#2
grave of forgotten cast member JM Dumont(John Monte Dumont) (findagrave)

1919 films
1919 drama films
1910s English-language films
American black-and-white films
Silent American drama films
American silent feature films
Famous Players-Lasky films
Films based on Canadian novels
Films based on Canadian plays
Films directed by George Loane Tucker
Films set in 1919
Films set in Massachusetts
Lost American films
Paramount Pictures films
Films based on adaptations
1919 lost films
Lost drama films
Articles containing video clips
1910s American films
Films about faith healing